Trechus quadristriatus is a beetle species in the family Carabidae, also known as the ground beetles. It is found in North America, Europe, temperate Asia, and Africa.

References

Further reading

External links

 

quadristriatus
Articles created by Qbugbot
Beetles described in 1781